Axbergs IF is a Swedish football club located in Ölmbrotorp.

Background
Axbergs IF plays in Division 5 Örebro Norra which is the seventh tier of Swedish football. They play their home matches at the Dyltavallen in Ölmbrotorp.

The club is affiliated to Örebro Läns Fotbollförbund.  The club withdrew from the league in the 2011 season although they did compete in the 2011 Svenska Cupen but lost 0–8 away to IFK Mariestad in the preliminary round.

Season to season

** The club immediately reconstructed the team after the withdrawal, which automatically placed them in the lowest tier in the league system.

*** Because of a lack of representational teams establishing in the lower league system, in parallel with clubs dropping out, it eventually led to a fusion were former local subdivisions became a single division.

Footnotes

External links
Axbergs IF – Official website
Axbergs IF on Facebook
Dyltavallen

Football clubs in Örebro County
1932 establishments in Sweden